North York is a dissolved municipality within the city of Toronto, Ontario, Canada.
 North York Centre, a district of Toronto, Ontario, Canada
 North York Centre (TTC), a subway station in North York Centre

North York may also refer to:

Places

America
 North York, Pennsylvania
 North York, Wisconsin

Britain
 North York Moors, England
 North Yorkshire, England

See also 
 York North (disambiguation)